Ulisses is a Portuguese-language given name. It is the Portuguese form of the English name Ulysses, which itself derives from a Latin form of Odysseus (a legendary Greek king).

People with the name
 Ulisses Soares (born 1958), Brazilian official in the Church of Jesus Christ of Latter-day Saints
 Ulisses Morais (born 1959), Portuguese footballer
 Ulisses Correia e Silva (born 1962), Prime Minister of Cape Verde
 Ulisses Braga Neto (born 1971), Brazilian academic
 Ulisses (footballer, born 1986), full name Ulisses Alves da Silveira, Brazilian football left-back
 Ulisses (footballer, born 1989), full name Ulisses Rocha de Oliveira, Brazilian football midfielder
 Ulisses Garcia (born 1996), Swiss footballer
 Ulisses (footballer, born 1999), full name Ulisses Wilson Jeronymo Rocha, Brazilian football defender

See also
 Ulises, the Spanish variant of the name
 Ulises (orca)

Portuguese masculine given names